Jordan D. C. Evans (born January 22, 1991) is a Canadian record producer, songwriter, and talent manager from Toronto. His production resume includes working with major recording artists like Jay-Z, Eminem, Drake, John Legend, Ellie Goulding, and his own protégé, Daniel Caesar. He is a co founder of the record label Golden Child Recordings.

Career 
Evans manages the careers of recording artists Charlotte Day Wilson and Daniel Caesar along with frequent collaborator Matthew Burnett, who both produced the entirety of Daniel Caesar's award-winning and critically acclaimed debut album, Freudian.

In June 2014, Eminem's 'Not Afraid' (co-produced by Jordan Evans) was certified Diamond by the Recording Industry Association of America (RIAA), surpassing 10 million copies.

The Instrumental for Drake's Single 'Pound Cake' (produced by Jordan Evans and Boi-1da) spawned a series of remixes and freestyles by many artists including Raekwon, Lupe Fiasco, the LOX, Meek Mill, Skeme, and Childish Gambino.

Discography

2010

Drake – Unreleased
 "Something"

Bun B – Trill OG
 "It's Been a Pleasure (feat. Drake)"

Eminem – Recovery
 "Not Afraid"

2012

Tyga – Careless World
 "I'm Gone" (feat. Big Sean)

Meek Mill – Dreams & Nightmares
 "Traumatized"

Kirko Bangz
 "Hold it Down" (feat. Young Jeezy)

Marsha Ambrosius
 "Get it Over With"

Childish Gambino – Royalty
 "Wonderful" (feat. John Osho)

2013

Drake – Nothing Was The Same
 "Pound Cake" (feat. Jay Z)

Rich Gang (Young Money) – Rich Gang
 "R.G." (feat. Mystikal)

Sean Leon – Ninelevenne, the Tragedy
 All production by Jordan Evans

Ben Stevenson
 "Opposites Attract"

Don Trip – Help Is On The Way
 "All On Me"

Doley Bernays – Just In Case
 "Drown"

Marsha Ambrosius – Friends and Lovers
 "Get It Over With"

2014

Game  – Blood Moon: Year of the Wolf
 "Married To The Game" ft. (French Montana, Dubb & Sam Hook)

Freddie Gibbs 
 "Hittaz"

G-Eazy – These Things Happen
 "Opportunity Costs"

Sean Leon – narcissus, THE DROWNING OF EGO
 All production by Jordan Evans

Daniel Caesar – Praise Break
 All Production by Jordan Evans

Chris Batson – Painless
 * Produced with Chris Batson

2015

Jahkoy – Single
"Vacay"

Daniel Caesar – Pilgrim's Paradise
 All production by Jordan Evans

Drake – If You're Reading This It's Too Late
 "How About Now"

Jaime Foxx – Hollywood: A Story of a Dozen Roses
 "You Changed Me" ft. (Chris Brown)

Kyle – Smyle
 "Remember Me?" ft. (Chance The Rapper)

PartyNextDoor
 "Some of Your Love"

Chris Batson
 '"Belong"

Various artists – Magic Mike XXL Original Motion Picture Soundtrack
 "How Does It Feel"

2016

PartyNextDoor
"You Made It"

Ellie Goulding – Single
 "Just in Case"

SoMo – "The Answers"
 '"Control"

Daniel Caesar – Single

 "Won't Live Here"
 "Get You" (feat. Kali Uchis)
 "Japanese Denim"

2017

Chris Brown – Heartbreak on a Full Moon

"Reddi Whip"

Daniel Caesar – Freudian (Executive Producer)

 "Get You"(feat. Kali Uchis)
 "Best Part"(feat. H.E.R)
 "Hold Me Down"
 "Neu Roses(Transgressor's Song)"
 "Loose"
 "We Find Love"
 "Blessed"
 "Take Me Away" (feat. Syd)
 "Transform" (feat. Charlotte Day Wilson)
 "Freudian"

H.E.R. – H.E.R.

 "Best Part" (feat. Daniel Caesar)

2018
Jessie Reyez – Single
 "Figures, a Reprise" (feat. Daniel Caesar)

Mez – Data Plan .001 
 "The Shift"

Daniel Caesar – Single
 "Who Hurt You?"

2019 
John Legend – Single
 "Preach" (Urban Radio Edit)

Daniel Caesar – CASE STUDY 01 (Executive Producer)
 "CYANIDE"
 "LOVE AGAIN" (Daniel Caesar & Brandy)
 "OPEN UP"
 "RESTORE THE FEELING" (feat. Sean Leon & Jacob Collier)
 "SUPERPOSITION" (feat. John Mayer) (additional production)

Drake – Care Package
 "How Bout Now"

2021 
Dylan Sinclair – Single
 "Black Creek Drive"

2022 
Daniel Caesar – Single
 "Please Do Not Lean" (feat. BADBADNOTGOOD)

Giveon – Give or Take
 "Dec 11th"

Accolades 
Evans has been nominated for multiple Grammy Awards and Juno Awards, among other accolades, as a songwriter and record producer. He won a Juno Award in 2018 for R&B/Soul Recording of the Year for Freudian.

Much Music Awards

Grammy Awards

JUNO Awards

Canadian Screen Awards

References

External links
Jordan Evans on Twitter
Jordan Evans on Blazetrak

1991 births
Living people
Canadian hip hop record producers
People from Toronto